Archips goyerana, the baldcypress leafroller, is a moth of the family Tortricidae.

Distribution
It is known from southern Louisiana and south-western Mississippi. It originally may have been endemic to forested wetlands, but has undergone a population explosion and expansion of its range since 1983.

Description
The length of the forewings is 6.8–8.5 mm for males and 8–10 mm for females.

Biology
The larvae feed on Taxodium distichum and are considered a serious pest of that tree species.

There is one generation per year, with overwintering egg masses attached to the bark of 
thin twigs of the host plant in obligate diapause. Dormant eggs hatch by bud break of baldcypress trees during late February and early March. The first instar larvae disperse and seek out the terminal portions of expanding foliage, burrow within the cluster of young needles and begin feeding. They feed on the opening leaf buds and elongating leaves. As the foliage expands, developing larvae produce silk to roll adjacent needles and branchlets into a 
tight mass, surrounding themselves individually and then feeding on the foliage inside. Larvae undergo five larval instars before pupation. Adults emerge between late April and mid May.

Etymology
The species is named for Richard A. Goyer of the Department of Entomology, Louisiana Agricultural Experiment Station, Louisiana State University Agricultural Center, Baton Rouge, Louisiana. He collected the holotype as well as most of the paratypes, and is responsible for the majority of the research on the biology and ecology of the species.

External links
Archips goyerana, n. sp. (Lepidoptera: Tortricidae) an important pest of baldcypress (Taxodiaceae) in Louisiana and Mississippi
mothphotographersgroup

Archips
Moths described in 2000
Moths of North America